Alexandra Popp (born 6 April 1991) is a German footballer and Olympic gold medalist. She plays as a striker for VfL Wolfsburg and the Germany national team. She previously played for FCR 2001 Duisburg and 1. FFC Recklinghausen. Popp was named German Footballer of the Year twice, in 2014 and 2016, and in February 2019, was named captain of the national team.

Club career

Popp started her career at FC Silschede, playing there in mixed-gender teams until she reached the age limit of 14. Later she changed to 1. FFC Recklinghausen and played three years before joining the Bundesliga side FCR 2001 Duisburg in 2008. She had also been approached by French champions Olympique Lyonnais at the time, but chose Duisburg. Popp made her Bundesliga debut in September 2008 against Herforder SV and scored her first two goals three weeks later in an 8–0 win over TSV Crailsheim.

In her first year at Duisburg, Popp won the Double: the 2009 UEFA Women's Cup and the 2009 German Cup. She was awarded the 2009 Fritz Walter medal in silver as the year's second best female junior player. One year later, she again claimed the German Cup title and finished runner-up with Duisburg in the 2009–10 Bundesliga season. Because Duisburg had major injury worries during the 2010–11 season, Popp played the majority of matches at left back.

In the 2012–13 season she moved with her club teammate Luisa Wensing to VfL Wolfsburg. In her first season there she won the treble with the Frauen-Bundesliga championship, the DFB-Pokal Frauen and the UEFA Women's Champions League.

A year later Wolfsburg successfully defended their UEFA Women's Champions League title. For the Bundesliga championship, it came down to a match on the final day of the season against the previously unbeaten 1. FFC Frankfurt. Frankfurt needed only a draw to win the championship, while Wolfsburg needed to win. Popp scored the winning goal in the 89th minute, and Wolfsburg was again victorious in the DFB-Pokal.

International career
At the 2008 UEFA U-17 Women's Championship, Popp won her first international title with Germany, scoring the team's second goal in the final. The same year, she reached third-place at the 2008 FIFA U-17 Women's World Cup. In February 2010, Popp made her debut for Germany's senior national team in a friendly match against North Korea. Less than two weeks later she scored her first two international goals at the 2010 Algarve Cup in a 7–0 win over Finland.

Popp returned to junior competition for the 2010 FIFA U-20 Women's World Cup on home soil. She won the title and became the tournament's best player and top goalscorer. She scored in every game that Germany played and with ten goals, she holds the scoring record for that tournament (together with Sydney Leroux and Christine Sinclair).

Popp was then called up for the 2011 FIFA Women's World Cup. She played in all four games as a substitute, but the Germans were eliminated in the quarter-finals by eventual champions Japan. Later that year, she played in a European Championship qualifying match against Kazakhstan, where she and teammate Célia Šašić each contributed four goals to a record 17–0 victory. With this achievement, she became the seventh German woman to score four goals in an international game.

On 24 May 2015, Silvia Neid called Popp up for the 2015 FIFA Women's World Cup. In Canada, Germany finished fourth, defeating fellow European powerhouses Sweden and France but were eventually defeated by eventual champions the United States. Popp started in four of the team's seven games, scoring once.

Popp was called up again for the 2016 Summer Olympics, where Germany won the gold medal. She played in all six games, contributing a goal and two assists. She received the Silbernes Lorbeerblatt, Germany's highest sports honour, for her performance, along with the rest of the German team.

Popp missed the UEFA Women's Euro 2017 tournament due to injury. The loss of a key player like her reasonably impacted Germany's performance, as they lost in the quarter-finals to Denmark.

She was the captain of the German squad for the 2019 FIFA Women's World Cup. She played every minute of the group stage and scored a header against South Africa. She made her 100th appearance for Germany on 22 June 2019 against Nigeria in the round of 16, where she also scored the opening goal.

Popp scored both of Germany's goals in their semi-final win against France in Euro 2022.

Personal life
Popp attended Gesamtschule Berger Feld in Gelsenkirchen, one of four facilities certified as "elite schools of football" by the German Football Association. She was the school's sole female pupil and could only attend courtesy of a special permit. She studied and trained with junior players of the German men's Bundesliga side FC Schalke 04. Popp left school after the 12th grade with a Fachabitur diploma. Following a one-year internship at a physiotherapist, Popp successfully completed a three-year apprenticeship to become a zookeeper at Tierpark Essehof in Lehre.

In interviews she has declared herself a fan of Borussia Dortmund.

Career statistics

Scores and results list Germany's goal tally first, score column indicates score after each Popp goal.

Honours

FCR 2001 Duisburg
 UEFA Women's Champions League: 2008–09
 Bundesliga: runner-up 2009–10
 DFB-Pokal: 2008–09, 2009–10

VfL Wolfsburg
 UEFA Women's Champions League: 2012–13, 2013–14
 Bundesliga: 2012–13, 2013–14, 2016–17, 2017–18,  2018–19
 DFB-Pokal: 2012–13, 2014–15, 2015–16, 2016–17,  2017–18, 2018–19

Germany
 Summer Olympic Games: Gold medal, 2016
 UEFA Women's Championship runner-up: 2022
 Algarve Cup: 2012, 2014

Germany U20
 FIFA U-20 Women's World Cup: 2010

Germany U17
 FIFA U-17 Women's World Cup: third place 2008
 UEFA U-17 Women's Championship: 2008

Individual
 UEFA Women's Under-17 Championship: Golden Player 2008
 Fritz Walter Medal: Silver 2009
 FIFA U-20 Women's World Cup Golden Ball: 2010
 FIFA U-20 Women's World Cup Golden Shoe: 2010
 Footballer of the Year in Germany: 2014, 2016
 Silbernes Lorbeerblatt: 2016
 IFFHS Women's World Team: 2020, 2022
 UEFA Women's Championship Silver Boot: 2022
 UEFA Women's Championship Team of the Tournament: 2022

References

External links

 
 
 
 
 National team profile at DFB 
 Player German domestic football stats at DFB 
 
 
 Alexandra Popp – A star in the making Feature by Chris Punnakkattu Daniel
 
 
 

1991 births
Living people
People from Witten
Sportspeople from Arnsberg (region)
German women's footballers
Germany women's international footballers
FCR 2001 Duisburg players
VfL Wolfsburg (women) players
2011 FIFA Women's World Cup players
2015 FIFA Women's World Cup players
Women's association football forwards
Footballers at the 2016 Summer Olympics
Olympic medalists in football
Olympic gold medalists for Germany
Medalists at the 2016 Summer Olympics
Olympic footballers of Germany
Footballers from North Rhine-Westphalia
People educated at the Gesamtschule Berger Feld
2019 FIFA Women's World Cup players
FIFA Century Club
UEFA Women's Euro 2022 players
Frauen-Bundesliga players